Jocara maroa is a species of snout moth in the genus Jocara. It is found in Cuba.

References

Moths described in 1922
Jocara
Endemic fauna of Cuba